The Weizhou Grand Mosque is a mosque in Tongxin County, Wuzhong City, Ningxia Hui Autonomous Region, China. Plans to demolish the mosque led to widespread protests in 2018 and 2019.

History
Weizhou's old mosque was constructed during the Ming dynasty in the traditional Chinese palatial style. The mosque was expanded and renovated three times during the Qing dynasty and the Republican era. It was named by the American Episcopal missionary Charles L. Pickens, Jr., who traveled to western China in the 1920s-1930s. He documented many places and peoples and remarked the place as "one of the most beautiful in all China." It was destroyed during the Cultural Revolution in the 1960s. 

Plans for a reconstruction were made and began in 2015, with plans approved by local authorities. Chinese officials claim that the mosque was expanded beyond the plans approved, in an Arab rather than Chinese style. Local officials were criticized by the Commission for Discipline Inspection of Wuzhong City in May for their lack of supervision during the mosque's renovations.

Proposed demolition
Ningxia officials stated on 3 August 2018 that the mosque will be forcibly demolished on Friday because it had not received the proper permits before construction. The Weizhou Grand Mosque was built in Tongxin County, Wuzhong City with about 23 million Muslim population, Ningxia Hui Autonomous Region. Local government accepted the rebuilding of Weizhou Grand Mosque in 2015, and its work started the same year. After the renovation was finished, the scale of the mosque was bigger than the standards.

A local Chinese Communist Party document mentioned that the Weizhou Grand Mosque had to be demolished since it was carrying out illegal extensions since 2016. Officials in the town were saying the mosque had not been given proper building permits, because it is built in the Middle Eastern architectural style. The residents were alarmed by this and helped stopped the destruction of the mosque. However, the idea that the Chinese government is against Arab style buildings is unfounded in facts but based on a single BBC report: "For centuries Hui Muslim mosques were built in a more Chinese style, and it appears that the new structure is viewed by the local government as an example of a growing Arabisation of Chinese Islam.

Incident
According to Reuters news agency, the Ningxia officials "forcibly demolished" notice was shared online among the ethnic Hui Muslim community, and in a rare demonstration against the Chinese government, thousands of ethnic Hui Muslims had gathered at the mosque location to protest its planned demolition. Public demonstrations are rare in China, because the government quickly suppresses any "hint of dissent". However, shared videos on social media was showing large crowds gathered outside the Grand Mosque in the town of Weizhou to protect it. The Hui are the largest of the 10 Muslim minority groups within China, and speak a variation of Mandarin — the language spoken by China's majority Han ethnic group.

According to the Hong Kong-based South China Morning Post newspaper, the main question of protesters was: "why the authorities had not stopped construction of the mosque during its two years of construction, if it had not been granted relevant permits?"

An official from the local Islamic Association told Reuters that the mosque would not be demolished entirely; with only fixes on the building structure were to be made. Associated Press news agency reported, the Muslim community would not accept this proposal. Documents show that Hui protesters grouped at the Weizhou mosque and carried Chinese national flags that expressed support for the Communist Party.

Reactions
Stephen McDonell, the BBC's China correspondent, reported: "For centuries Hui Muslim mosques were built in a more Chinese style, but the local government considered the Grand Mosque in the town of Weizhou as an example of a growing Arabic architecture between Chinese Muslim."

According to ABC news, many Weibo users in China were agreeing with the pulling down of the mosque.

A group of American lawmakers publicly asked the United States government to engage in more sanctions on Xinjiang, especially against key Chinese officials and politicians who had a role in demolishing the mosque.

See also
 Tongxin Great Mosque
 Taizi Great Mosque
Islamophobia in China

References

Buildings and structures in Ningxia
Mosques in China
Wuzhong, Ningxia